Idlewild Creek is a tributary of East Branch Tunkhannock Creek in Susquehanna County, Pennsylvania, in the United States. The creek is not designated as an impaired waterbody and has no named tributaries. A  lake known as Lake Idlewild is located in the creek's watershed. Wild trout naturally reproduce in the creek.

Course
Idlewild Creek begins near the northern border of Clifford Township, at the foot of a mountain. It flows southwest for a short distance before entering a wetland and turning west. Upon exiting the wetland, the creek turns southwest for several tenths of a mile, entering Lake Idlewild, where it receives an unnamed tributary from the right. From the southern end of the lake, it flows south for a short distance before turning southeast for a few tenths of a mile. The creek then enters a wetland where it receives an unnamed tributary from the left and turns south. After several tenths of a mile, it receives another unnamed tributary from the left and passes near another wetland, turning south-southwest for more than a mile. The creek then turns west for a short distance before reaching its confluence with East Branch Tunkhannock Creek.

Hydrology, geography and geology

The surficial geology along the lower reaches of Idlewild Creek consists mainly of alluvium, although a till known as Wisconsinan Till is more prevalent on the sides of the valley, and occurs along the creek itself at times. There are also a few wetland patches and one patch of Wisconsinan Ice-Contact Stratified Drift. Further upstream, the surficial geology is mostly Wisconsinan Till, except for Lake Idlewild, a wetland, and some patches of bedrock consisting of sandstone and shale on nearby hills.

A  lake known as Lake Idlewild is located in the watershed of Idlewild Creek. The designated uses of the lake are aquatic life and potable water.

Idlewild Creek is not designated as an impaired waterbody.

Watershed
The creek is entirely within the United States Geological Survey quadrangle of Clifford. Its mouth is located within  of Royal.

Williams Field Services Company, LLC. has been issued a permit to build, maintain, and operate a  natural gas pipeline crossing one or more unnamed tributaries of Idlewild Creek. The creek is one of the receiving streams for an Erosion and Sediment Control permit.

History
Idlewild Creek was entered into the Geographic Names Information System on August 2, 1979. Its identifier in the Geographic Names Information System is 1177685.

Biology
Wild trout naturally reproduce in the lower  of Idlewild Creek. The creek is classified as a Coldwater Fishery and a Migratory Fishery.

The designated use for Idlewild Creek is aquatic life.

See also
Dundaff Creek, next tributary of East Branch Tunkhannock Creek going upstream
List of rivers of Pennsylvania

References

Rivers of Susquehanna County, Pennsylvania
Tributaries of Tunkhannock Creek
Rivers of Pennsylvania